Dębno - is a Polish coat of arms. It was used by several szlachta families in the times of the Polish–Lithuanian Commonwealth.

History

Battle cry is not Dębno, that is the Polish town it is associated with in history. Means Oak woods or forest.

Blazon
This version of the coat of arms is a modern interpretation only. Arms date to 1241 AD and the Mongol invasion of Batu Khan.

Notable bearers
Notable bearers of this coat of arms include:
 Jaroslav Olesnitsky (1875–1933) — Ukrainian diplomat, politic, lawyer. Head of the Ukrainian mission to the United Kingdom (1920-1921).;
Jan Głowacz z Oleśnicy
Zbigniew Oleśnicki

See also
 Polish heraldry
 Heraldry
 Coat of arms

Polish coats of arms